Tomoplagia biseriata is a species of tephritid or fruit flies in the genus Tomoplagia of the family Tephritidae.

References

Tephritinae